Shikari (English: The Hunter) is a 2000 Indian  crime thriller film directed by N. Chandra. It stars Govinda, Karisma Kapoor, Tabu and Kiran Kumar. It was second collaboration between the trio Govinda, Karishma & Tabu after blockbuster Saajan Chale Sasural. It was first time that Govinda had chosen an anti-hero role while Karishma Kapoor chose an action-packed role, during when Govinda was briefly typed in comic roles and Karishma for glamorous roles. Govinda also wore a prosthetic makeup for the first time in his career. It was released on the eve of Dusshera. Upon release it was an average grosser at the box office, but later it gained cult following due to Govinda's work being mostly appreciated by critics.

Plot

Vijandra is the richest business tycoon in Cape Town, South Africa. His sister Rajeshwari, wife Suman and his mother are his only relatives. Vijandra's marital life is in apparent discord, since he has never had any relations with Suman. One day, Vijandra gets a rival in business world in form of Mahendra Pratap Singh. Mahendra is an Indian spice tycoon wanting to expand his business in South Africa.

Vijandra is initially wary of Mahendra's expansion plans, but sees the latter's entry as a tool to expand his own business. Unknown to Vijandra, Mahendra is actually a well disguised man named Om Srivastav. Om has a bigger agenda than becoming a tycoon. Mahendra & Vijandra strike a deal, upon which Vijandra is invited to a house in forest for celebration. Once there, Mahendra reveals his true face to Vijandra, who is revealed to know Om.

Om kills Vijandra and covers up his death. Later, he shows up at Vijandra's funeral, claiming that he and Vijandra met in India, where they became friends. Rajeshwari suspects him from day one and finds his timing suspicious. Suman too is particularly unhappy on seeing Om. Suman reveals to her mother-in-law that she & Om were in love with each other, but her father got her married to Vijandra, the son of her father's old friend.

Suman tells her that she had told Vijandra about the relationship, after which he told her to go with Om. Instead, she stayed with Vijandra, being overwhelmed by his compassion. However, Vijandra thought that Suman was a gold-digger, explaining his attitude towards her. Meanwhile, a cat and mouse game starts between Om and Rajeshwari, in which she nearly exposes him. Om is able to save his skin once again, but Rajeshwari gets a feeling that Om is hurt by something.

Rajeshwari thinks that Om may not be a killer & she has inadvertently hurt the wrong man. She goes to apologize, but finds many pictures of her at his apartment. Rajeshwari thinks that Om was hurt because he was secretly in love with her. Rajeshwari asks for an apology & Om plays along. Suman becomes both jealous & uneasy of this new relationship. She and Rajeshwari finally get into a fight, where she almost slaps Rajeshwari.

Rajeshwari leaves her home in a huff and tells everything to Om, who shocks her by slapping her. An angered Om goes on to tell her everything, finally confessing his sin. Before Rajeshwari can do anything, he throws her in a dry well & escapes in his car. Suman tries to find Rajeshwari at Om's place. Om feigns ignorance and the duo start to search for her, with Om deliberately misleading Suman.

Rajeshwari screams for help, until Zafrani comes to that place. He rescues her and she darts back to locate Om. When she finally finds Om with Suman, she is fully convinced that her brother's murder was a pre-meditated by Om & Suman. Seeing his plans failing, Om overpowers the duo & ties them up. He confesses the crime before Suman, making Rajeshwari realize that Suman is in fact innocent.

Then Om reveals his motive. It is revealed that after learning about Om from Suman, Vijandra had secretly come with his goons, assaulted Om, killed his father & raped his sisters, forcing them to commit suicide. Om readies himself to mow Rajeshwari and Suman down, but Zafrani arrives there with a police team. The women are rescued, but Om drives his car into the valley making them realize that Om was going to commit suicide to avoid police, now that his work was done. The women return home distraught.

Cast

 Govinda as Om Shrivastav / Mahendra Pratap Singhania (dual role)
 Karisma Kapoor as Rajeshwari Rawal
 Tabu as Suman 
 Shweta Menon as Sanya Jacobs
 Nirmal Pandey as Veejendra Singh Rawal
 Sushma Seth as Rajeshwari's mother
 Kiran Kumar as Arjun Singh
 Johnny Lever as Jafrani
 Rana Jung Bahadur as Inspector Rana
 Vishnu Sharma
 Beena Banerjee as Beena
 Deep Dhillon
 Razak Khan
 Arun Bali
 Ghanshyam
 Pramod Muthu
 Anil Nagrath
 Pushpa Verma
 Mayuri Kango (Item number)

Production
Aditya Pancholi was approached for Nirmal Pandey's role but declined it due to other projects. Jackie Shroff was too offered Nirmal Pandey's role but he too declined the role for some unknown reasons. Arbaaz Khan was to star in the film as the main hero opposite Tabu and having Govinda play the villain in the movie but Arbaaz was shooting for Hello Brother at that time so N. Chandra scrapped his role. Manisha Koirala was heavily considered for Karishma Kapoor's role.

Soundtrack
Music was released on T-Series

References

External links 
 

2000 films
Films scored by Aadesh Shrivastava
2000s Hindi-language films
Films directed by N. Chandra
Indian films about revenge
Indian thriller films
2000 thriller films
Hindi-language thriller films